Postciliodesmatophora is a subphylum of ciliates.

Members of this subphylum share stacks of postciliary microtubular ribbons associated with somatic kinetosomes, and called postciliodesmata.

References 

 
Bikont subphyla
Ciliate taxonomy